Helping Spot Organisation is a Hyderabad based NGO whose objective works to end poverty and stop female disciples. And also works for the safety of women in the society. So that India can make the country poverty free as well as make it a safe country.

References 

Organizations established in 2015
Organisations based in Telangana
2015 establishments in Telangana